Italy originally planned to participate in the Eurovision Song Contest 2020. The winner of the "" section of the 70th Sanremo Festival, Diodato with "", would have represented Italy at the Eurovision Song Contest 2020, which was planned to be held in Rotterdam, the Netherlands. However, the contest was cancelled due to the COVID-19 pandemic.

Background 

Prior to the 2020 Contest, Italy had participated in the Eurovision Song Contest forty-five times since its first entry during the inaugural contest in 1956. Since then, Italy has won the contest on two occasions: in 1964 with the song "" performed by Gigliola Cinquetti and in 1990 with the song "" performed by Toto Cutugno. Italy has withdrawn from the Eurovision Song Contest a number of times with their most recent absence spanning from 1998 until 2010. Their return in 2011 with the song "Madness of Love", performed by Raphael Gualazzi, placed second—their highest result, to this point, since their victory in 1990. In the 2019 edition, Mahmood represented Italy with the song "", placing second with 472 points.

Between 2011 and 2013, the broadcaster used the Sanremo Music Festival as an artist selection pool where a special committee would select one of the competing artist, independent of the results in the competition, as the Eurovision entrant. The selected entrant was then responsible for selecting the song they would compete with. For 2014, RAI forwent using the Sanremo Music Festival artist lineup and internally selected their entry. Since 2015, the winning artist of the Sanremo Music Festival is rewarded with the opportunity to represent Italy at the Eurovision Song Contest, although in 2016 the winner declined and the broadcaster appointed the runner-up as the Italian entrant.

Before Eurovision

Artist selection

Italian broadcaster RAI confirmed that the performer that would represent Italy at the 2020 Eurovision Song Contest would be selected from the competing artists at the Sanremo Music Festival 2020. According to the rules of Sanremo 2020, the winner of the festival earns the right to represent Italy at the Eurovision Song Contest, but in case the artist is not available or refuses the offer, the organisers of the event reserve the right to choose another participant via their own criteria. The competition took place between 4 and 8 February 2020 with the winner being selected on the last day of the festival.

Twenty four artists competed in Sanremo 2020. Among the competing artists were former Eurovision Song Contest entrants Raphael Gualazzi and Francesco Gabbani, who represented Italy in 2011 and 2017 respectively. Additionally, Elodie's song was co-written by Mahmood, who represented Italy in 2019.

On 7 February, Bugo and Morgan were disqualified for failing to deliver their performance during the fourth evening.

Final
The 23 Big Artists each performed their entry again for a final time on 8 February 2020. A combination of public televoting (34%), press jury voting (33%) and expert jury voting (33%) selected the top three to face a superfinal vote, then the winner of Sanremo 2020 was decided. Diodato was declared the winner of the contest with the song "".

At Eurovision 
The Eurovision Song Contest 2020 was to take place at Rotterdam Ahoy in Rotterdam, Netherlands and consists of two semi-finals on 12 and 14 May and the final on 16 May 2020. According to Eurovision rules, all nations with the exceptions of the host country and the "Big Five" (France, Germany, Italy, Spain and the United Kingdom) are required to qualify from one of two semi-finals in order to compete for the final; the top ten countries from each semi-final progress to the final. As a member of the "Big 5", Italy automatically qualifies to compete in the final. In addition to their participation in the final, Italy is also required to broadcast and vote in one of the two semi-finals. However, the contest was cancelled due to the COVID-19 pandemic.

References

2020
Countries in the Eurovision Song Contest 2020
Eurovision